MV BBC China was a  general cargo vessel constructed in China that was completed in 2000. The ship was initially named Beluga Superstition, being renamed in 2002. The vessel gained notoriety after it was caught carrying gas centrifuges for uranium enrichment to Libya in 2003. In 2004, the vessel ran aground off the coast of South Africa. The wreck was subsequently demolished with explosives.

Description
The ship was powered by a diesel engine turning one shaft.

Construction and career
The cargo ship's keel was laid down at Qingshan Shipyard in Wuhan, China on 28 February 2000. While under construction the ship was named Beluga Superstition. The vessel was launched on 4 November 2000 and was completed on 4 July 2001. On 1 October 2002, the ship was renamed BBC China. BBC China was operated by Beluga Shipping GMBH of Bremen, Germany, and flagged in Antigua & Barbuda. 

In October 2003 the ship was diverted to Italy while carrying gas centrifuges and nuclear components for uranium enrichment from Scomi Precision Engineering and A. Q. Khan's Khan Research Laboratories via Dubai to Libya. With the aid of the German shipping company and the German government, the vessel was redirected to Italy where US government personnel boarded the vessel and discovered the centrifuges, which had not been on the vessel's manifest.

The vessel was declared constructive total loss and subsequently demolished with explosives.

See also 
Libya and weapons of mass destruction
Abdul Qadeer Khan
Scomi Precision Engineering nuclear scandal

References 

Maritime incidents in 2003
Maritime incidents in 2004
2000 ships
Ships built in Wuhan
Nuclear proliferation
Cargo ships of Antigua and Barbuda
Nuclear technology in Libya